Our Lady Star of the Sea, commonly called Star of the Sea, was an all-girl Catholic high school, established in Grosse Pointe Woods, Michigan in 1959.

When the high closed in 1993, the parish middle school began using the building.

Notable alumni
Paula Campbell Kelly, General Counsel for Porsche Cars Canada

References

Private high schools in Michigan
Defunct Catholic secondary schools in Michigan
Girls' schools in Michigan